Jonathan Erlich and Andy Ram were the defending champions but were eliminated in the first round by Alex Kuznetsov and Ryan Sweeting.

Mahesh Bhupathi and Nenad Zimonjić defeated Mariusz Fyrstenberg and Marcin Matkowski 6–3, 6–3 in the final.

Draw

External links
Association of Tennis Professionals (ATP) draw

Men's Doubles